Chokher Bali may refer to:

Chokher Bali (novel), a Bengali novel by Rabindranath Tagore
Chokher Bali (film) a 2003 film adaptation of the novel directed by Rituparno Ghosh
 Chokher Bali (TV series), a Bengali television serial